You're My Everything is a 1949 American comedy musical film directed by Walter Lang and starring Dan Dailey and Anne Baxter.

Plot
Boston, 1924: A starstruck Hannah Adams waits outside in the rain to meet Tim O'Connor, who has just performed in a musical on stage. She invites him home to meet her family, and soon, they are in love and getting married.

Tim gets a Hollywood screen test. Hannah is asked to read with him, and ends up the one being offered a contract. She becomes a star in silent movies. At the advent of sound, she retires to have a baby and live with Tim on a farm.

Their daughter, Jane, is taken by Tim to studio chief Henry Mercer when a child's role in a film becomes available. A hesitant Hannah agrees to let her daughter be in just one movie, but Tim conceals the fact that Jane is being given a three-picture contract. The conflict threatens to break up the family.

Cast
Dan Dailey as Timothy O'Connor
Anne Baxter as Hannah Adams
Anne Revere as Aunt Jane
Stanley Ridges as Mr. Henry Mercer
Shari Robinson as Jane O'Connor
Henry O'Neill as Prof. Adams
Selena Royle as Mrs. Adams
Alan Mowbray as Joe Blanton
Robert Arthur as Harold
Buster Keaton as Butler

Radio adaptation
You're My Everything was first presented in a one-hour adaptation starring Anne Baxter and Phil Harris, on Lux Radio Theatre on November 27, 1950. Harris was a last-minute replacement for Dailey, who was ill. It was re-done on Lux on February 23, 1953, starring Dailey and Jeanne Crain.

References

External links

1949 films
1949 musical comedy films
20th Century Fox films
American musical comedy films
1940s English-language films
Films scored by Alfred Newman
Films about actors
Films directed by Walter Lang
Films set in the 1920s
Films with screenplays by Lamar Trotti
1940s American films